Reedus is a surname. Notable people with the surname include:

Norman Reedus (born 1969), American actor, voice actor, television host, and model
Tony Reedus (1959–2008), American jazz drummer

See also
Redus